Anarchaea is a genus of Australian shield spiders that was first described by Michael Gordon Rix in 2006.

Species
 it contains four species, found only in Queensland, New South Wales, and Tasmania:
Anarchaea corticola (Hickman, 1969) (type) – Australia (Tasmania)
Anarchaea falcata Rix, 2006 – Australia (New South Wales)
Anarchaea raveni Rix, 2006 – Australia (Queensland)
Anarchaea robusta (Rix, 2005) – Australia (Tasmania)

See also
 List of Malkaridae species

References

Araneomorphae genera
Malkaridae
Spiders of Australia